Masako Doi (born 9 June 1995) is a Japanese judoka.  She is the gold medallist of the 2018 Judo Grand Slam Osaka in the 60 kg category.  She won the silver medal in her event at the 2022 Judo Grand Slam Paris held in Paris, France.

References

External links
 

1995 births
Living people
Japanese female judoka
21st-century Japanese women